Kia Ora is a small dairy farming locality in North Otago, centred on Kia Ora Hall. It is located 10 kilometres west of Oamaru and a similar distance north of Maheno. The nearest watercourse is Robbs Crossing River, a small tributary of the Kakanui River.

The name is a common greeting in the Māori language and literally means "May you live". The area was a location where a large amount of moa bones were discovered in 1930.

References

Populated places in Otago
Waitaki District